The Gerstein Report was written in 1945 by Kurt Gerstein, Obersturmführer of the SS-TV, who served as Head of Technical Disinfection Services of the SS during the Second World War and in that capacity supplied a pesticide, based on hydrogen cyanide, Zyklon B, from Degesch (Deutsche Gesellschaft für Schädlingsbekämpfung) to Rudolf Höss in Auschwitz and conducted the negotiations with the owners.

On 18 August 1942, along with Rolf Günther and Wilhelm Pfannenstiel, Gerstein witnessed the gassing of some 3,000 Jews in the extermination camp of Belzec in occupied Poland.

When Gerstein surrendered to the French Commandant in the occupied town of Reutlingen on 22 April 1945, he was sent to the town of Rottweil, where he was placed under "honourable captivity" and was given accommodation in the Hotel Mohren. There, he composed his report first in French and then in German.

Personal details

Gerstein was born on 11 August 1905 in Münster, where he lived until 1910 and then to Saarbrücken; Halberstadt; and Neuruppin, near Berlin, where he finished his secondary school in 1925. He attended universities in Marburg, Aachen and Berlin and received an engineering degree in 1931. During his studies, he was active in the Protestant youth movements.

He joined the Nazi Party in May 1933. As a committed Christian, Gerstein resisted attempts by the Nazis to control the Christian youth movement and ran afoul of state authorities. He was expelled from the party in October 1936 after his arrest in September for circulating anti-Nazi pamphlets. Released, he was arrested a second time in July 1938 and spent two months in a concentration camp. Reportedly outraged by the euthanasia programme, Aktion T4, he decided to join the Waffen SS "to look into the matter of these ovens and chambers in order to learn what happened there".

Because of his technical education, Gerstein was placed in the Waffen-SS technical disinfection services where he rose quickly to become its head. It was in that capacity that he travelied to the extermination camps of Belzec and Treblinka to offer the supply of hydrogen cyanide (Zyklon B).

Testimony regarding gas chambers

Gerstein stated that on 18 August 1942, he travelled to the Belzec extermination camp, where he witnessed the arrival of "45 wagons with 6,700 people of whom 1,450 were already dead on arrival". He described the gassing operation as it happened directly in front of him:

Reporting

The final part of the report describes Gerstein's attempts to circulate his eyewitness testimony. He reports on his chance encounter with the secretary of the Swedish legation in Berlin, Baron Göran von Otter, on the Warsaw-Berlin train: "Still under the immediate impression of the terrible events, I told him everything with the entreaty to inform his government and the Allies of all of this immediately because each day's delay must cost the lives of further thousands and tens of thousands". Von Otter talked with high-ranking officials at the Swedish Foreign Ministry. However, the information was not passed on to the Allies or to any other party. He also reports on his unsuccessful attempts to see the Papal Nuncio Cesare Orsenigo in Berlin. Gerstein wished to notify the Vatican. Informed of the purpose of Gerstein's visit, Orsenigo refused to meet with him. Gerstein's message was eventually sent to the Vatican not by the nuncio's office but by the auxiliary bishop of Berlin, where the information reached a "dead end". In addition to those attempts, Gerstein also stated he reported these eyewitness accounts to "hundreds of personages." Although not explicitly mentioned in the 1945 report, one of the attempts was by a Dutch industrialist, J.H. Ubbink, who in February 1943 visited Gerstein in Berlin:

 

Ubbink passed the information on to a member of the Dutch Resistance, Cornelius Van der Hooft, who a few days later, on March 23, 1943, wrote "Tötunsanstalten in Polen" (English translation: "Killing Institutions in Poland"), a four-page report in Dutch that apparently remained hidden in the chicken coop of another member of the Dutch Resistance and did not come to light until 1996. The March report, however, seemed to have been sent to the Dutch government-in-exile, as on April 24, 1943, one month after the meeting between Van der Hooft and Ubbink, another version of the report inspired by Gerstein was written. Typed on paper without an official heading and with the simplified title of Tötungsanstalten, this version circulated within the Dutch government-in-exile via the British government and eventually to the attention of the United States Inter-Allied Information Committee.

Use as evidence in trials
Gerstein's report has been used as evidence in a number of high-profile cases. It was used at the Nuremberg Trials against major Nazi war criminals such as Hermann Göring and Hans Frank. It was also later used in the 1961 prosecution of Adolf Eichmann by an Israeli court. In 2000, it was used by Christopher Browning in the Holocaust libel trial between David Irving and Deborah Lipstadt.

Accuracy
Some aspects of Gerstein's report include false statements that were attributed to Odilo Globocnik, as well as inaccurate claims regarding the total number of Jews gassed at Holocaust locations in which he was not an eyewitness, but his claim that gassing of Jews occurred at Belzec was independently corroborated by SS-Standartenführer Wilhelm Pfannenstiel's testimony given at the Belzec trials, as well as by the accounts of other witnesses that can be found in Gitta Sereny's Into That Darkness, a biography of the Treblinka commandant Franz Stangl.

The Holocaust historian Christopher Browning noted: 

Many aspects of Gerstein's testimony are unquestionably problematic. [In making] statements, such as the height of the piles of shoes and clothing at Belzec and Treblinka, Gerstein himself is clearly the source of exaggeration. Gerstein also added grossly exaggerated claims about matters to which he was not an eyewitness, such as that a total of 25 million Jews and others were gassed. But in the essential issue, namely that he was in Belzec and witnessed the gassing of a transport of Jews from Lwow, his testimony is fully corroborated.... It is also corroborated by other categories of witnesses from Belzec.

The historian Robin O'Neil noted that Gerstein's data presented at face value about the enormous capacity of the gas chambers of "four times 750 persons" has no grounds in reality.

The Gerstein Report has also been targeted by Holocaust deniers, who claim that its author approached Göran von Otter on behalf of the Nazis. The French historian Pierre Vidal-Naquet in "Assassins of Memory" considered such allegations to be preposterous.

See also

 Jäger Report, 1941
 Einsatzgruppen reports, 1941–1942
 Wilhelm Cornides Report of what he saw at Belzec, 1942
 Wannsee Conference, 1942
 Katzmann Report, 1943
 Korherr Report, 1943
 Riegner Telegram, 1942
 Höfle Telegram, 1943
 Special Prosecution Book-Poland, 1937–1939

Notes and references

 Sereny, Gitta: Into That Darkness. McGraw-Hill, 1974.

External links
Kurt Gerstein: A German Spy in the SS
Kurt Gerstein, Conscience-Stricken SS Officer
The Gerstein Report (in English)
The Gerstein Report (in German)
Trial of Adolf Eichmann, Session 75- Mention of the Gerstein Report 

Holocaust historical documents
Operation Reinhard
Belzec extermination camp
1945 documents
Witnesses to The Holocaust